William Swaddon may refer to:
William Swaddon  (politician), MP for Calne, 1604–1605
William Swaddon  (priest), his son, Archdeacon of Worcester, 1610–1623